Josef Charles Yarney (born 8 October 1997) is an English professional footballer who plays as a defender for Oldham Athletic.

Career
Born in Liverpool, Yarney began his career at Everton, before moving to Newcastle United in July 2017. He signed on loan for Morecambe on 11 August 2018, making his senior debut later that same day. In January 2019 he moved on loan to Chesterfield.

After being released by Newcastle at the end of the 2018–19 season, in June 2019 it was announced that he would sign permanently for Chesterfield after the expiry of his contract on 30 June 2019.

He signed for Weymouth in October 2021. In November 2021, he moved to Indian I-League club RoundGlass Punjab.

On 7 January 2023, Yarney signed for National League side Oldham Athletic following a successful trial.

References

1997 births
Living people
Footballers from Liverpool
English footballers
Association football defenders
Everton F.C. players
Newcastle United F.C. players
Morecambe F.C. players
Chesterfield F.C. players
Weymouth F.C. players
RoundGlass Punjab FC players
Oldham Athletic A.F.C. players
English Football League players
National League (English football) players
English expatriate footballers
English expatriate sportspeople in India
Expatriate footballers in India